The 2000 Herefordshire Council election was held on 4 May 2000 to elect all councillors on Herefordshire Council.

All 37 wards were contested - each electing either one or two members to the council. The election resulted in the council passing into "no overall control" with the Liberal Democrats, who held 21 seats, forming the largest group in the council chamber.

Results

The overall turnout was 39.12% with a total of 58,460 valid votes cast. A total of 283 ballots were rejected.

Council Composition
After the election, the composition of the council was:

G - Green Party

Ward Results
All councillors elected will serve a three-year term. All results are listed below:

Aylestone

Backbury

Belmont

Bircher

Bringsty

Bromyard

Brumarsh

Central

Credenhill

Dinmore Hill

Frome

Golden Cross

Golden Valley

Hagley

Hampton Court

Hinton

Hollington

Holmer

Hope End

Kington

Ledbury

Leominster East & South

Leominster North

Lyonshall With Titley

Marcle Ridge

Merbach

Mortimer

Old Gore

Penyard

Ross-on-Wye East

Ross-on-Wye West

St. Martins

St. Nicholas

Three Elms

Tupsley

Upton

Weobley

References

2000
20th century in Herefordshire
2000 English local elections